Lahiru Kumara (born 7 December 1995) is a Sri Lankan cricketer. He made his first-class debut for Sri Lanka Air Force Sports Club in Tier B of the 2018–19 Premier League Tournament on 21 May 2019.

References

External links
 

1995 births
Living people
Sri Lankan cricketers
Sri Lanka Air Force Sports Club cricketers
Place of birth missing (living people)